Hypolophota amydrastis is a species of snout moth in the genus Hypolophota. It was described by Alfred Jefferis Turner in 1904 and is known from Australia (including Queensland).

References

External links

Moths described in 1904
Tirathabini
Insects of Australia